Jakubowice Murowane  is a village in Lublin County, Lublin Voivodeship, in eastern Poland. It is the seat of the gmina (administrative district) called Gmina Wólka.

References

Villages in Lublin County